Louis II (1 July 1506 – 29 August 1526) was King of Hungary, Croatia and Bohemia from 1516 to 1526. He was killed during the Battle of Mohács fighting the Ottomans, whose victory led to the Ottoman annexation of large parts of Hungary.

Early life 
At his premature birth in Buda on 1 July 1506, the court doctors kept him alive by slaying animals and wrapping him in their warm carcasses as a primitive incubator. He was the only son of Vladislaus II Jagiellon and his third wife, Anne of Foix-Candale.

Coronation
Vladislaus II took steps to ensure a smooth succession by arranging for the boy to be crowned in his own lifetime; the coronation of Louis as king of Hungary took place on 4 June 1508 in Székesfehérvár Basilica, and his coronation as king of Bohemia was held on 11 March 1509 in St. Vitus Cathedral in Prague.

King of Hungary and Croatia 

In 1515 Louis II was married to Mary of Austria, granddaughter of Emperor Maximilian I, as stipulated by the First Congress of Vienna in 1515. His sister Anne was married to Mary's brother Ferdinand, then a governor on behalf of his brother Charles V, and later Emperor Ferdinand I.
During the greater part of his reign he was the puppet of the magnates and kept in such penury that he was often obliged to pawn his jewels to get enough food and clothing. His guardians, Cardinal Tamás Bakócz and Count George Brandenburg-Ansbach, shamefully neglected him, squandered the royal revenues and distracted the whole kingdom with their endless dissensions. Matters grew even worse on the death of Cardinal Bakócz, when the magnates István Báthory, John Zápolya and István Werbőczy fought each other furiously, and used the diets as their tools.

King of Bohemia
As king of Bohemia, Louis became known as "Ludovicus the Child". The first thaler coins were minted during his reign in Bohemia, later giving the name to the dollars used in different countries. These correctly style him as "LVDOVICVS•PRIM•D:GRACIA•REX•BO*" (Louis the First, by the grace of God King of Bohemia).

War with the Ottomans 

After his father's death in 1516, the minor Louis II ascended to the throne of Hungary and Croatia. Louis was adopted by the Holy Roman Emperor Maximilian I in 1515. When Maximilian I died in 1519, Louis was raised by his legal guardian, his cousin George, Margrave of Brandenburg-Ansbach.

Following the accession to the throne of Suleiman I, the sultan sent an ambassador to Louis II to collect the annual tribute that Hungary had been subjected to. Louis refused to pay the annual tribute and had the Ottoman ambassador executed and sent the head to the Sultan. Louis believed that the Papal States and other Christian States including Charles V, Holy Roman Emperor would help him. This event hastened the fall of Hungary.

Hungary was in a state of near anarchy in 1520 under the rule of the magnates. The king's finances were a shambles; he borrowed to meet his household expenses despite the fact that they totaled about one-third of the national income. The country's defenses weakened as border guards went unpaid, fortresses fell into disrepair, and initiatives to increase taxes to reinforce defenses were stifled. In 1521 Sultan Suleiman the Magnificent was well aware of Hungary's weakness.

The Ottoman Empire declared war on the Kingdom of Hungary, Suleiman postponed his plan to besiege Rhodes and made an expedition to Belgrade. Louis and his wife Mary requested military aid from other European countries. His uncle, King Sigismund of Poland, and his brother-in-law, Archduke Ferdinand, were willing to help. Ferdinand dispatched 3,000 infantry troops and some artillery while preparing to mobilize the Austrian estates, while Sigismund promised to send footmen. The coordination process totally failed though. Mary, although a determined leader, caused distrust by relying on non-Hungarian advisors while Louis lacked vigour, which his nobles realized. The Austrian military aid, although seemingly strengthening the border, even had the undesired effect of dissolving the unified leadership that the ban had held until that time. 

Belgrade and many strategic castles in Serbia were captured by the Ottomans. This was disastrous for Louis' kingdom; without the strategically important cities of Belgrade and Šabac, Hungary, including Buda, was open to further Turkish conquests.

After the siege of Rhodes, in 1526 Suleiman made a second expedition to subdue all of Hungary. 
Around the middle of July, the young King departed from Buda, determined to "either fight back the invaders or be crushed once and for all". Louis made a tactical error when he tried to stop the Ottoman army in an open field battle with a medieval army, insufficient firearms, and obsolete tactics. On 29 August 1526, Louis led his forces against Suleiman in the disastrous Battle of Mohács. The Hungarian army was surrounded by Ottoman cavalry in a pincer movement, and in the center the Hungarian heavy knights and infantry were repulsed and suffered heavy casualties, especially from the well-positioned Ottoman cannons and well-armed and trained Janissary musketeers.

Nearly the entire Hungarian Royal army was destroyed in nearly 2 hours on the battlefield. During the retreat, the twenty-year-old king died when he fell backwards off his horse while trying to ride up a steep ravine of the Csele stream.  He fell into the stream and, due to the weight of his armor, he was unable to stand up and drowned. After the death of Louis, Ferdinand (as husband to Louis' sister Anna), contested for the crown of Bohemia and Hungary. His bid for Hungary split the opinion of the magnates, with the majority electing John Zápolya. This split would later cause the majority of Hungary to be ruled under the Ottomans.

Jagiellons in natural line 
Although Louis II's marriage remained childless, he probably had an illegitimate child with his mother's former lady-in-waiting, Angelitha Wass. This son was called John (János in Hungarian). This name appears in sources in Vienna as either János Wass or János Lanthos. The former surname  is his mother's maiden name. The latter surname may refer to his occupation. "Lanthos" means "lutenist", or "bard". He received incomes from the Royal Treasury regularly. He had further offspring.

Legacy

North of the town of Mohacs, there is a 5 meter high monument to the memory of Lajos II.  It is located near the site of Louis' death at the Csele Stream.  On the monument there is a bronze plaque which depicts Lajos falling off his horse.  On the top of the monument there is a figure of a sleeping lion.  Soma Turcsányi, a 
Hussar lieutenant, at his own expense, constructed the original commemorative column in 1864.  It was reconstructed in 1897.  The monument was restored by the local government in 1986.

Ancestry

References

Sources

Bibliography 
 Takings, Endorser: II. Lajos kinkily fiat (A Son of King Louis II Jagiellon), Salado (Periodical Centuries), pp.& NBS;183–185, 1903

External links 

|-

1506 births
1526 deaths
Medieval kings of Bohemia
Kings of Croatia
Burials at the Basilica of the Assumption of the Blessed Virgin Mary
Jagiellonian dynasty
Kings of Hungary
Knights of the Golden Fleece
Monarchs killed in action
Modern child monarchs
16th-century Hungarian people